The 1940 NCAA basketball tournament involved eight schools playing in single-elimination play to determine the participating champion of men's NCAA Division I college basketball. The second edition of the tournament began on March 20, 1940, and ended with the championship game on March 30 in Kansas City, Missouri. A total of eight games were played, including a single third place game in the West region.

Indiana, coached by Branch McCracken, won the tournament title with a 60–42 victory in the final game over Kansas, coached by Phog Allen. Marvin Huffman of Indiana was named the tournament's Most Outstanding Player.

This would be the only tournament to feature Springfield College, the school James Naismith worked for when he invented the sport of basketball. They were the first of fourteen colleges and universities to compete in the tournament that are no longer in Division I. This was also the first appearance of the Kansas Jayhawks, whose first coach was Naismith.

Locations
The following are the sites selected to host each round of the 1940 tournament:

Regionals

March 20 and 21
East Regional, Butler Fieldhouse, Indianapolis, Indiana
West Regional, Municipal Auditorium, Kansas City, Missouri

Championship Game

March 30
Municipal Auditorium, Kansas City, Missouri

The 1940 tournament saw only two venues in use. Butler Fieldhouse, the largest college basketball arena in the country at the time, hosted the East regional on the campus of Butler University. Butler Fieldhouse, later renamed Hinkle Fieldhouse, would not host another NCAA tournament game until 2021. In Kansas City, the Municipal Auditorium hosted both the West Regional and the Championship Game. The Auditorium would go on to host another nine finals, nine regionals and two early rounds by 1964. The tournament would not return to Indianapolis again until 1978, when Market Square Arena hosted first-round games.

Teams

Bracket

Regional Third Place

See also
 1940 National Invitation Tournament
 1940 NAIA Division I men's basketball tournament

References

NCAA Division I men's basketball tournament
Ncaa
NCAA Division I men's basketball tournament
NCAA Division I men's basketball tournament